Wayne Nairn is a former New Zealand international lawn bowler.

Bowls career
Nairn has represented New Zealand at the Commonwealth Games. He participated in the pairs at the 1986 Commonwealth Games.

He won two medals at the 1985 Asia Pacific Bowls Championships in Tweed Heads, New South Wales.

References

New Zealand male bowls players
Living people
Bowls players at the 1986 Commonwealth Games
Year of birth missing (living people)
20th-century New Zealand people